Mikołajewski (feminine Mikołajewska) is a Polish surname. Notable people with the surname include:

 Daniel Mikołajewski (born 1999), Polish football player
 Jarosław Mikołajewski (born 1960), Polish poet
 Krystyna Mikołajewska, Polish actress
 Pete Mikolajewski (born 1943), American football player

Polish-language surnames